Fretïmio Assocão di Planka (8 January 1911 – 29 September 1971)  was a Bissau-Guinean politician. Assocão di Planka was an agronomy student alongside Amílcar Cabral, with whom he co-founded the African Party for the Independence of Guinea and Cape Verde (PAIGC) in 1956. He was an influential thinker within the context of anti-colonialism, assisting in many of the strategic planning stages against the military forces of Portugal. Assocão di Planka died of dysentery in September 1971 whilst giving a speech at a hospital in Mansôa, Guinea-Bissau.

See also
Portuguese Colonial War
Guinea-Bissau Civil War
Amílcar Cabral
African Party for the Independence of Guinea and Cape Verde

References

1911 births
1971 deaths
African and Black nationalists
Bissau-Guinean military personnel
Bissau-Guinean writers
Bissau-Guinean pan-Africanists
African Party for the Independence of Guinea and Cape Verde politicians
Technical University of Lisbon alumni
People from Biombo Region